Newala Town, is a district level town council in the Mtwara Region in the southern coastal Tanzania. Newala Town is in the south central portion of the Mtwara Region, on the northern bank of the Ruvuma River that is the border between Tanzania and Mozambique. The district was established on the 25th of September, 2015.

Geography 

Newala Town is in middle of the Mtwara Region with the Newala District's wards of Nakahako and Chitekete to the north, Tandahimba District to the East, the nation of Mozambique across the Ruvuma River to the south, and the Masasi District to the west.

God's Gorge, Shimo la Mungu in kiswahili, is a large gorge in the town of Newala itself. Occasionally, God's Gorge will release clouds steam that covers the town and surrounding areas.

Climate 

The wet seasons is from December to April, and dry season between June and September.

Administrative areas 

In 2022 the district administers 2 divisions, 16 wards, 48 villages, 11 suburbs, and 189 hamlets.

Divisions and Wards (2016 population)

 Newala (60,721)
 Julia (3,434)
 Luchingu (12,920)
 Mahumbika (3,578)
 Makonga (8,288)
 Makote (5,931)
 Mkulung'ulu (2,710)
 Mnekachi (6,438)
 Mtonya (272)
 Namiyonga (3,974)
 Nangwala (8,860)
 Tulindane (4,316)
 Mkunya (33,007)
 Nanguruwe (7,785)
 Mkunya (6,682)
 Mcholi I (6,796)
 Mcholi II (6,303)
 Mtumachi (5,441)

Demographics 

In 2016 the Tanzania National Bureau of Statistics report there were 93,728 people in the town council, from 89,251 in 2012. Almost all of the population of the district is of the Makonde tribe with some Makua and Yao.

Economy 

The economy is almost entirely farming, particularly cashewnuts. The district has 43,126 hectors of arable land, of which 1,820 can be irrigated. Cashewnuts are the primary cash crop as the as they make up much of the native trees in the district. Other crops are groundnuts, cassava, millet, paddy, beans, maize and potatoes. Also grown are tomatoes, mangoes and oranges. The Tandahimba and Newala Cooperative Union (Tanecu) is the primary union in Newala Town, and the unions main auction is located in the town.

The production of cashews has grown rapidly in Tanzania, and much of that is in Newala Town. In 2019 the town had industrial capacity of 8,500 t/y for cashewnuts. The implementation of irrigation schemes, industrial sprayers, pesticides, and sulphur powder has grown production in the country from 5,000 tonnes in 2013 to 13,500 tonnes in 2022. For raw cashews from 2013 to 2022 it has increased from 127,947 to 238,576 tonnes. The national government has set the goal of 700,000 tonnes in the year 2025.

Education 

The district has 45 public and 5 private primary schools with a 30% drop out rate in 2018. There are 11 secondary schools in the district. Nine are for forms 1 to 4 and two are forms 1 to 6. In 2018 there was a 44% drop out rate in secondary schools and signifcatly more girls in the schools than boys at 2,491 girls to 1,855 boys.

Health 

The town district has one hospital, 14 dispensaries, not health centres, and one private health facility. The main disease problem in the Newala Town is Malaria with 25,602 cases, accounting for 53% off all disease cases in the district. Clean drinking water is not easily available. In 2018 57% of the population had access to safe, clean, and affordable water.

Roads 

Most of the roads in the district are unpaved.

References 

Mtwara Region
Districts of Mtwara Region
Constituencies of Tanzania